Riley Garcia (born 30 January 2001) is an Australian rules footballer who plays for the  in the Australian Football League (AFL).

Early football
Garcia began playing football with the Caversham Suns Junior Football Club in the eastern suburbs of Perth. He played for Western Australia in the 2019 AFL Under 18 Championships, being named in the team's best in all of his first 3 games, but unfortunately suffered an Anterior cruciate ligament injury in the team's championship victory, rendering him unable to play for a vast majority of the 2020 AFL season.

AFL career
As a result of the injury he had suffered in 2019, Garcia was injured for the majority of the 2020 season. He completed his rehabilitation process in August 2020, and was able to participate in a scratch match against  on 2 August 2020. Garcia did not play at senior level in 2020, and had another minor injury to his knee in December 2020 which again set him back until March 2021. Garcia made his debut for the senior team in the 11th round of the 2021 AFL season. Unfortunately for Garcia, his poor injury luck continued, suffering a concussion in the first quarter of the game, which ruled him out of the rest of the game. Garcia returned to the senior team in round 15, where he kicked his first career goal and tallied 13 disposals. It was revealed that Garcia had signed a one year contract extension with the Bulldogs on 16 July 2021, tying him to the club until the end of the 2022 season.

Statistics
Statistics are correct to the end of round 18, 2021

|- style="background:#EAEAEA"
| scope="row" text-align:center | 2020
| 
| 38 || 0 || – || – || – || – || – || – || – || – || – || – || – || – || – || – || 0
|- 
| scope="row" text-align:center | 2021
| 
| 38 || 5 || 2 || 2 || 30 || 29 || 59 || 7 || 5 || 0.4 || 0.4 || 6.0 || 5.8 || 11.8 || 1.4 || 1.0 || 
|- style="background:#EAEAEA; font-weight:bold; width:2em"
| scope="row" text-align:center class="sortbottom" colspan=3 | Career
| 5
| 2
| 2
| 30
| 29
| 59
| 7
| 5
| 0.4
| 0.4
| 6.0
| 5.8
| 11.8
| 1.4
| 1.0
| 0
|}

References

2001 births
Living people
Western Bulldogs players
Sportsmen from Western Australia
Australian rules footballers from Western Australia
Swan Districts Football Club players